José Luis Alonso Berbegal (born 25 February 1927) is a Spanish former sports shooter. He competed in the trap event at the 1964 Summer Olympics.

References

1927 births
Living people
Spanish male sport shooters
Olympic shooters of Spain
Shooters at the 1964 Summer Olympics
Place of birth missing (living people)
20th-century Spanish people